Edward Thomas Hardy  (born 15 September 1977) is an English actor. After studying acting at the Drama Centre London, he made his film debut in Ridley Scott's Black Hawk Down (2001). He has since been nominated for an Academy Award for Best Supporting Actor, two Critics' Choice Movie Awards, and two British Academy Film Awards, and received the 2011 BAFTA Rising Star Award.

Hardy has appeared in films such as Star Trek: Nemesis (2002), RocknRolla (2008), Bronson (2008), Warrior (2011), Tinker Tailor Soldier Spy (2011), Lawless (2012), This Means War (2012), Locke (2013), The Drop (2014), and The Revenant (2015), for which he received his Academy Award nomination. In 2015, he portrayed "Mad" Max Rockatansky in Mad Max: Fury Road and both Kray twins in Legend. He has appeared in three Christopher Nolan films: Inception (2010) as Eames, The Dark Knight Rises (2012) as Bane, and Dunkirk (2017) as an RAF fighter-pilot. He starred as both Eddie Brock and Venom in the 2018 anti-hero film Venom and its sequel Venom: Let There Be Carnage (2021).

Hardy's television roles include the HBO war drama mini-series Band of Brothers (2001), the BBC historical drama mini-series The Virgin Queen (2005), Bill Sikes in the BBC's mini-series Oliver Twist (2007), Heathcliff in ITV's Wuthering Heights (2009), the Sky 1 drama series The Take (2009), and as Alfie Solomons in the BBC historical crime drama series Peaky Blinders (2014–2022). He created, co-produced, and took the lead in the eight-part historical fiction series Taboo (2017) on BBC One and FX. In 2020, he also contributed narration work to the Amazon docuseries All or Nothing: Tottenham Hotspur.

Hardy has performed on both British and American stages. He was nominated for the Laurence Olivier Award for Most Promising Newcomer for his role as Skank in the production of In Arabia We'd All Be Kings (2003), and was awarded the 2003 Evening Standard Theatre Award for Outstanding Newcomer for his performances in both In Arabia We'd All Be Kings and Blood, in which he played Luca. He starred in the production of The Man of Mode (2007) and received positive reviews for his role in the play The Long Red Road (2010). Hardy is active in charity work and is an ambassador for the Prince's Trust. He was appointed a CBE in the 2018 Birthday Honours for services to drama.

Early life
Edward Thomas Hardy was born in the Hammersmith district of London on 15 September 1977, the only child of artist and painter Anne (née Barrett) and novelist and comedy writer Edward "Chips" Hardy. He is of Irish descent on his mother's side. He was raised in London's East Sheen suburb. Hardy attended Tower House School, Reed's School, and Duff Miller Sixth Form College. He later studied at Richmond Drama School and the Drama Centre London, now a part of Central Saint Martins. He has named Gary Oldman, with whom he would later work on Tinker Tailor Soldier Spy, as his "hero" and added that he mirrored scenes from Oldman while at drama school.

Career

In 1998, Hardy won The Big Breakfast Find Me a Supermodel competition at the age of 21, earning him a brief contract with Models 1. Hardy joined Drama Centre London in September 1998, and was taken out early after winning the part of US Army Private John Janovec in the HBO-BBC mini-series Band of Brothers. He made his feature film debut in Ridley Scott's war thriller Black Hawk Down (2001). During this time, Hardy also had a brief stint as a rapper and hip hop producer with his friend Edward Tracy (under the name "Tommy No 1 + Eddie Too Tall"), with whom he recorded a mixtape called Falling On Your Arse in 1999 that remained unreleased until 2018.

In 2002, Hardy appeared as the Reman Praetor Shinzon, a clone of USS Enterprise Captain Jean-Luc Picard in Star Trek: Nemesis. The following year, he appeared in the film Dot the i, and then travelled to North Africa for Simon: An English Legionnaire, a story of the French Foreign Legion. He then returned to the United Kingdom to feature in the horror film LD 50 Lethal Dose (2003).

Hardy was awarded the 2003 London Evening Standard Theatre Award for Outstanding Newcomer for his performances in Blood and In Arabia We'd All Be Kings performed at the Royal Court Theatre and Hampstead Theatre. He was also nominated for a 2004 Laurence Olivier Award for Most Promising Newcomer of 2003 in a Society of London Theatre Affiliate for his performance as Skank in the aforementioned production of In Arabia We'd All Be Kings. Hardy appeared with Emilia Fox in the BBC mini-series The Virgin Queen (2005) as Robert Dudley, a childhood friend of Elizabeth I. Dudley's character has been described as an ambiguous young man who is torn between the affection of his wife (played by Fox), his love for Elizabeth, and his own ambitions. Hardy featured in the BBC Four adaptation of the 1960s science fiction series A for Andromeda.

In 2007, he appeared in BBC Two's drama based on a true story, Stuart: A Life Backwards. He played the lead role of Stuart Shorter, a homeless man who had been subjected to years of abuse and whose death was possibly a suicide. The same year he played Bill Sikes in the BBC mini-series Oliver Twist, an adaptation of Charles Dickens's novel that aired on PBS Masterpiece Classic in the US. In February 2008, he played a drug-addicted rapist in the British horror-thriller WΔZ. In September 2008, he appeared in Guy Ritchie's London gangster film, RocknRolla; Hardy played the role of gay gangster Handsome Bob. In 2008, Hardy starred in the film Bronson, about the real-life English prisoner Charles Bronson, who has spent most of his adult life in solitary confinement. For the film, he put on three stone (42 lb or 19 kg).

In June 2009, Hardy starred in Martina Cole's four-part TV drama The Take on Sky One, as a drug and alcohol-fuelled gangster. The role gained him a Best Actor nomination at the 2009 Crime Thriller Awards. In August 2009, he appeared in ITV's Wuthering Heights, playing the role of Heathcliff. In early 2010, Hardy starred in The Long Red Road at the Goodman Theatre in Chicago. The play was written by Brett C. Leonard and directed by Philip Seymour Hoffman. Hardy won some good reviews for his portrayal of Sam, an alcoholic trying to drink away his past. In 2010, he starred as Eames in Christopher Nolan's science fiction thriller Inception for which he won a BAFTA Rising Star award. Hardy replaced Michael Fassbender in the 2011 film adaptation of Tinker Tailor Soldier Spy, released on 5 September 2011 at the 68th edition of the Mostra Internazionale d'Arte Cinematografica in Venice. In March 2010, Hardy signed a first-look deal at Warner Bros.

In 2011, Hardy appeared in the film Warrior, which was released on 9 September 2011 by Lionsgate Films. His performance as Tommy Riordan, who is trained by his father to fight in a mixed martial arts tournament against his brother, gained praise from critics. Hardy also starred in This Means War (2012), a romantic comedy directed by McG. He played the supervillain Bane in The Dark Knight Rises, the final film in Christopher Nolan's The Dark Knight Trilogy, released on 20 July 2012. He played a bootlegger in John Hillcoat's crime drama Lawless (2012). Hardy has signed up to play the lead role of Sam Fisher in Ubisoft's forthcoming film adaptation of their video game series Tom Clancy's Splinter Cell. He also appeared in Riz Mc's music video for the song "Sour Times".

In 2014, Hardy appeared in the crime film The Drop alongside James Gandolfini, in what would be the latter's final appearance in a feature film before his death. Hardy also joined the cast of the BBC crime drama Peaky Blinders in its second series. He portrays Alfie Solomons, the head of a Jewish gang and runner of a distillery which disguises itself as a bakery.

Hardy starred in five films in 2015. The first, Child 44, set in 1950s Soviet Union, saw him playing Leo Demidov, a Soviet secret police agent who investigates a series of child murders. Despite mild praise for his acting, Child 44 was reviewed negatively by critics and was a box office failure. Hardy then played the title character, Max Rockatansky, in the action film Mad Max: Fury Road (2015). His performance was praised by critics and overall the film received critical acclaim and became a box office success, grossing over $378 million against a $150 million budget, becoming the highest-grossing film in the Mad Max franchise. He played a dual role as London gangsters Reggie and Ronnie Kray in the crime thriller Legend (2015). On 7 December 2015, Hardy won Best Actor at the British Independent Film Awards for his portrayal of the Kray twins, and on the same night attended the premiere of the biographical western thriller The Revenant, in which he reunited with his Inception co-star Leonardo DiCaprio, at Leicester Square, London. On 14 January 2016, Hardy received his first Academy Award nomination for Best Supporting Actor for his performance in The Revenant.

Hardy played a Royal Air Force fighter pilot in Christopher Nolan's action-thriller Dunkirk (2017), based on the British military evacuation of the French port of Dunkirk in 1940 during the Second World War. He appeared alongside Mark Rylance, Kenneth Branagh, Cillian Murphy and Harry Styles. Hardy also co-produced and starred in the eight-part BBC One television drama series Taboo. It was created by Hardy, Steven Knight, and Hardy's father, Edward "Chips" Hardy. Taboo was aired in the United States by FX.

In 2018, Hardy starred in the film Venom as the title comic book sometime hero, Eddie Brock, and the symbiote Venom. Based on the Marvel source material, the film was released on 5 October, and is the first installment in Sony's Spider-Man Universe. In 2019, Hardy served as an executive producer in the 2019 BBC/FX three-part miniseries A Christmas Carol. In 2020, Hardy starred in Josh Trank's Al Capone biopic Capone.

Hardy is attached to star as British war photographer Don McCullin in a film based on McCullin's autobiography, Unreasonable Behaviour. Hardy reprised the role of Eddie Brock and Venom in the sequel Venom: Let There Be Carnage and co-wrote the story for the film. He is also slated to star as the Antarctic explorer Sir Ernest Shackleton in a biopic being created by the same makers of Taboo. The Shackleton film, which will cover one of the most harrowing stories of survival in exploration history, is also being produced by Hardy's production company Hardy Son & Baker.

Philanthropy
In 2010, Hardy became an ambassador for the Prince's Trust, a UK youth charity which provides training, personal development, business start-up support, mentoring, and advice. In 2012, he and his then-girlfriend (now-wife) Charlotte Riley became patrons of Bowel Cancer UK. Prior to the inaugural Invictus Games held in London in September 2014, he, along with other entertainers and athletes, read the poem "Invictus" in a promotional video.

Personal life
Hardy was married to Sarah Ward, a producer, from 1999 until they divorced in 2004. He met Rachael Speed, an assistant director, on the set of The Virgin Queen in 2005, and they had a son in April 2008 before separating in 2009. That year, Hardy began a relationship with actress Charlotte Riley after they met on the set of Wuthering Heights. They were married in July 2014. They have two children; the first was born in October 2015 and the second in December 2018. They had two rescue dogs, Max and Woodstock, and Hardy appeared with Woodstock in a PETA advert to promote pet adoption. Woodstock died on 5 June 2017 due to an aggressive case of polymyositis.

Hardy has suffered from dysthymia, and spent much time in his youth drinking alcohol and using crack cocaine to cope with it; he has said that he was going "out of control" with his drink and drug use before deciding to seek psychological help when he was 20 years old.

While portraying prisoner Charles Bronson during the production of the film about his life, Hardy met Bronson several times and the two became friends. Bronson was impressed with how Hardy managed to match his muscularity and how well he could mimic Bronson's personality and voice; he stated that he believed Hardy was the only person who could play him.

Hardy appeared on a 2016 Debrett's list of the most influential people in the United Kingdom. He was appointed Commander of the Order of the British Empire (CBE) in the 2018 Birthday Honours for services to drama.

Martial arts
An avid Brazilian jiu-jitsu practitioner, Hardy became the lead ambassador for the REORG Brazilian Jiu-Jitsu Foundation, which was launched in association with the Royal Marines Charity with the mission to provide a platform for serving personnel and veterans to learn Brazilian jiu-jitsu as part of their recovery pathway and to combat the challenge of mental health and physical disabilities.

Hardy enjoys practising Brazilian jiu-jitsu and has been seen training at Roger Gracie's affiliate schools. As of December 2020, he holds the rank of blue belt. He has won a number of jiu-jitsu competitions including at the 2022 UMAC Brazilian Jiu-Jitsu Open Championships in September 2022 where he won gold. Since then Hardy has travelled to Austin, Texas in order to train under John Danaher.

Filmography

Film

Television

Stage

References

Further reading

External links

 
 
 
 
 
 Tom Hardy at The Filmaholic

1977 births
Living people
20th-century English male actors
21st-century English male actors
Alumni of Richmond Drama School
Alumni of the Drama Centre London
BAFTA Rising Star Award winners
Commanders of the Order of the British Empire
English male film actors
English male models
English male stage actors
English male television actors
English people of Irish descent
English practitioners of Brazilian jiu-jitsu
English theatre directors
Male actors from London
Method actors
People educated at Reed's School
People educated at Tower House School
People from Hammersmith
People with mood disorders
Reality modeling competition winners